Oh Lord may refer to:

"Oh Lord" (In This Moment song), 2017
"Oh Lord" (Mic Lowry song), 2017
"Oh Lord", a song by Jessie J from the 2018 album R.O.S.E.

See also

Oh My Lord (disambiguation)